Taras Bulba, the Cossack (Italian: Taras Bulba, il cosacco) is a 1962 Italian historical adventure film directed by Ferdinando Baldi and starring Vladimir Medar, Jean-François Poron and Fosco Giachetti. It received an American release in 1970 under the title The Tartars. Based on the 1835 novel of the same title by Nikolay Gogol, it was made the same year as a much larger budget version Taras Bulba.

Cast
 Vladimir Medar as Taras Bulba 
 Jean-François Poron as Andrei Bulba 
 George Reich as Ostapi 
 Hugo Santana as Gurko 
 Lorella De Luca as Natalia 
 Fosco Giachetti as Voivode 
 Sylvia Sorrente 
 Erno Crisa 
 Mirko Ellis 
 Andrea Scotti 
 Dada Gallotti

References

Bibliography
 Roy Kinnard & Tony Crnkovich. Italian Sword and Sandal Films, 1908–1990. McFarland, 2017.

External links

1962 films
1960s Italian-language films
1960s historical adventure films
Italian historical adventure films
Films directed by Ferdinando Baldi
Films based on Taras Bulba
Films set in the 16th century
Films set in Ukraine
1960s Italian films